Capitation may refer to:

 Poll tax or head tax, a tax of a fixed amount per individual
 Capitation (healthcare), a system of payment to medical service providers
 Capitation fee, a fee or payment of a uniform amount charged per person

See also
 Cavitation, the formation and then immediate implosion of cavities in a liquid